Bear Stadium is a baseball venue in Conway, Arkansas, United States.  It is home to the Central Arkansas Bears college baseball team of the NCAA's Division I Southland Conference.  Last rebuilt in 2009, the facility has a capacity of 1,000 spectators.

History

Renovations
After the Bears' 2007 move to Division I, the UCA baseball facility was rebuilt to be appropriate to the new playing level.  In the offseason between 2008 and 2009, the old facility was demolished and construction on the present one began.

The newly constructed ballpark, Bear Stadium, featured 106 chairbacks (part of a 1,000-spectator grandstand), press box, wheelchair elevator, concourse, and backstop.  Following the 2010 season, a GeoGreen artificial turf surface was installed and the playing surface was raised.

Events
The stadium's first game was on February 20, 2009, when Central Arkansas defeated Tennessee-Martin 11–5.  In 2010, Baseball Hall of Fame inductee Goose Gossage threw out the first pitch before a Bears game against Northwestern State.  In 2011, the field hosted the Arkansas high school baseball championships.

Attendance
The stadium's first game, held on February 20, 2009, attracted 517 spectators.  A record 732 people attended the April 3, 2009, game against Texas State, the day of the stadium's official dedication.

Top 10 attendance marks
Below is a list of Bear Stadium's 10 best-attended games.

As of the 2011 season.

See also
 List of NCAA Division I baseball venues

References

External links
Bear Stadium Gallery at Arkansas Diamonds

College baseball venues in the United States
Baseball venues in Arkansas
Buildings and structures in Conway, Arkansas
Central Arkansas Bears baseball
Southland Conference Baseball Tournament venues
University of Central Arkansas